Centro Habana is one of the 15 municipalities or boroughs (municipios in Spanish) in the city of Havana, Cuba. There are many retail spaces (such as Plaza de Carlos III commercial center, office buildings, hotels, bars and clubs (such as the Casa de la Musica on Galliano). A chinatown - Barrio Chino - is also located in this district. It is a smaller municipality of Havana, and it has the highest population density.

Centro Habana is divided into five consejos populares (wards): Cayo Hueso, Colón, Dragones, Los Sitios and Pueblo Nuevo.

History
The infrastructure of the city, built 450 years ago, heavily deteriorated during the 1990s after the collapse of the Cuban-Soviet trade partnership. In 1996, restoration projects were started to improve housing and infrastructure in the Cayo Hueso community.

Centro Habana was established as an administrative division in 1963 and later formally made its own municipio in 1976.

Demographics
In 2004, the municipality of Centro Habana had a population of 158,151.

See also

Malecon
Barrio de San Lázaro
Havana Plan Piloto

References

Gallery

External links

 Centro Habana guia turistica - touristic guide (Spanish)
 Hotels in Centro Habana, Cuba Travel and tourism.

Municipalities of Havana